Ivanhoe is a 1913 British silent historical film directed by Leedham Bantock and starring Lauderdale Maitland, Ethel Bracewell and Nancy Bevington. It is based on the 1819 novel Ivanhoe by Sir Walter Scott.

A separate American adaptation Ivanhoe was released the same year.

Cast
 Lauderdale Maitland - Ivanhoe
 Ethel Bracewell - Rebecca
 Nancy Bevington - Lady Rowena
 Hubert Carter - Isaac
 Harry Lonsdale - Sir Brian
 Austin Milroy - Front de Boeuf

References

External links

1913 films
British historical films
1910s historical films
Films based on Ivanhoe
British silent feature films
British black-and-white films
1910s English-language films
1910s British films